Brian Seymour Vesey-Fitzgerald (1900-1981) was a naturalist and writer of books on wildlife, cats, and dogs.

Life and work
Vesey-Fitzgerald began his career as a journalist with Reuters.  He then became the naturalist on the staff of The Field magazine, becoming editor from 1938 to 1946. He then devoted his time to writing and broadcasting.  Apart from wildlife, cats and dogs, he had particular interest in the countryside in general, gypsies, fairgrounds and boxing.  He showed sympathy with both poachers and gamekeepers.

He was the author of the New Naturalist volume British Game (1946). He wrote a weekly column about cats and dogs in the News of the World. His radio broadcasts about country life included Field Fare (1940-1945) and There and Back (1947-1949).

He was an acknowledged authority on gypsies,  and was President of the British Fairground Society. He was a member of the National Cat Club and honorary Vice-President of the Siamese Cat Club of South Africa.

He was editor of the 60 volume series County Books which were published in the years 1947-53 and of the 31 volume series The Regional Books which were published during the 1950s.

Books 
A selection of books by Brian Vesey-Fitzgerald:
A Book of British Waders (1939)
Hampshire Scene (1940)
Programme For Agriculture (Editor) (1941)
A Country Chronicle (1942)
Hedgerow and Field (1943) 
Gypsies of Britain (1944)
British Game: New Naturalist No. 2 (1946)
The Book Of The Horse (1946)
The British Countryside in Pictures (1946)
Birds Trees and Flowers Illustrated: The Nature Lover's Companion to Familiar British Birds, Trees and Flowers, fully Illustrated with Photographs, Drawings and Colour Plates, by Brian Vesey-Fitzgerald and others (1947)
The Book of the Dog (1948)
It's My Delight (1948)
Background to Birds (1948)
Bird Biology for Beginners, illus. L. R. Brightwell (1948)
British Bats, illus. Eric Ennion (1949)
The Senses of Bats (1949)
Rivermouth, illus. Charles Tunnicliffe (1949)
The Hampshire Avon (1950)
British Birds and Their Nests, illus. Allen W. Seaby. (1950)
Fly Fishing by Turing, H.D. (Editor) (1951)
The Regional Books, a series of 31 volumes (Editor) (1952 - 1958)
The First Ladybird Book of British Birds and their Nests, illus. Allen W. Seaby (1953)
The Second Ladybird Book of British Birds and their Nests, illus. Allen W. Seaby (1955)
The Third Ladybird Book of British Birds and their Nests (1956)
The Ladybird Book of British Wild Flowers (1957)
 Cats (Penguin Handbooks) (1957)
The Beauty of Cats (1958)
The Beauty of Dogs (1960)
Garden Flowers (Natural History), illus. John Leigh-Pemberton (1960)
A Bohemian Affair - short stories, etc. (1961)
The Ladybird Book of Trees, illus. S. R. Badmin (1963)
About Dogs (1963)
Animal Anthology (1965)
Best Animal Stories (1965)
Portrait of the New Forest (1966)
The World of Ants, Bees and Wasps (1969)
Town Fox, Country Fox (Survival Books) (1965)

References

Further reading
 Vesey-Fitzgerald, Brian, Gypsies of Britain, Chapman and Hall, 1944, repr. 1946
 Vesey-Fitzgerald, Brian Cats, Penguin Books, Harmondsworth, 1957
 Various authors, The Regional Books edited by Vesey-Fitzgerald, Brian, Robert Hale Ltd, 1952 -1958

External links
 Brian Vesey-Fitzgerald | BFI
 Desert Island Discs: Brian Vesey-Fitzgerald

British naturalists
20th-century British writers
1900 births
1981 deaths
British male journalists
New Naturalist writers
20th-century British male writers
British book editors
20th-century naturalists